Environmental radioactivity is not limited to actinides; non-actinides such as radon and radium are of note. While all actinides are radioactive, there are a lot of actinides or actinide-relating minerals in the Earth's crust such as uranium and thorium. These minerals are helpful in many ways, such as carbon-dating, most detectors, X-rays, and more.

Inhalation versus ingestion 
Generally, ingested insoluble actinide compounds, such as high-fired uranium dioxide and mixed oxide (MOX) fuel, will pass through the digestive system with little effect since they cannot dissolve and be absorbed by the body. Inhaled actinide compounds, however, will be more damaging as they remain in the lungs and irradiate the lung tissue.

Ingested low-fired oxides and soluble salts such as nitrate can be absorbed into the blood stream. If they are inhaled then it is possible for the solid to dissolve and leave the lungs. Hence, the dose to the lungs will be lower for the soluble form.

Actinium
Actinium can be naturally found in traces in uranium ore as 227Ac, an α and β emitter with half-life 21.773 years. Uranium ore contains about 0.2 mg of actinium per ton of uranium. It is more commonly made in milligram amounts by neutron irradiation of 226Ra in a nuclear reactor. Natural actinium almost exclusively consists of one isotope, 227Ac, with only minute traces of other shorter-lived isotopes (225Ac and 228Ac) occurring in other decay chains.

Thorium 

In India, a large amount of thorium ore can be found in the form of monazite in placer deposits of the Western and Eastern coastal dune sands, particularly in the Tamil Nadu coastal areas. The residents of this area are exposed to a naturally occurring radiation dose ten times higher than the worldwide average.

Occurrence 
Thorium is found at low levels in most rocks and soils, where it is about three times more abundant than uranium and about as abundant as lead. On average, soil commonly contains approximately 6 parts per million (ppm) thorium. Thorium occurs in several minerals; the most common is the rare earth-thorium-phosphate mineral monazite, which contains up to 12% thorium oxide. Several countries have substantial deposits. 232Th decays very slowly (its half-life is about three times the age of the Earth). Other isotopes of thorium occur in the thorium and uranium decay chains. These are shorter-lived and hence much more radioactive than 232Th, though on a mass basis they are negligible.

Effects in humans 

Thorium has been linked to liver cancer. In the past, thoria (thorium dioxide) was used as a contrast agent for medical X-ray radiography but its use has been discontinued. It was sold under the name Thorotrast.

Protactinium
Protactinium-231 occurs naturally in uranium ores such as pitchblende, to the extent of 3 ppm in some ores. Protactinium is naturally present in soil, rock, surface water, groundwater, plants and animals in very low concentrations (on the order of 1 ppt or 0.1 picocuries (pCi)/g).

Uranium 

Uranium is a natural metal which is widely found. It is present in almost all soils and it is more plentiful than antimony, beryllium, cadmium, gold, mercury, silver, or tungsten, and is about as abundant as arsenic or molybdenum. Significant concentrations of uranium occur in some substances such as phosphate rock deposits, and minerals such as lignite, and monazite sands in uranium-rich ores (it is recovered commercially from these sources).

Seawater contains about 3.3 parts per billion of uranium by weight as uranium (VI) forms soluble carbonate complexes. Extraction of uranium from seawater has been considered as a means of obtaining the element. Because of the very low specific activity of uranium the chemical effects of it upon living things can often outweigh the effects of its radioactivity. Additional uranium has been added to the environment in some locations, from the nuclear fuel cycle and the use of depleted uranium in munitions.

Neptunium 
Like plutonium, neptunium has a high affinity for soil. However, it is relatively mobile over the long term, and diffusion of neptunium-237 in groundwater is a major issue in designing a deep geological repository for permanent storage of spent nuclear fuel. 237Np has a half-life of 2.144 million years and is therefore a long-term problem; but its half-life is still much shorter than those of uranium-238, uranium-235, or uranium-236, and 237Np therefore has higher specific activity than those nuclides. It is used only to make plutonium-238 when bombarded with neutrons in a lab.

Plutonium

Sources 
Plutonium in the environment has several sources. These include:

Atomic batteries
In space
In pacemakers
Bomb detonations
Bomb safety trials
Nuclear crime
Nuclear fuel cycle
Nuclear power plants

Environmental chemistry 

Plutonium, like other actinides, readily forms a plutonium dioxide (plutonyl) core (PuO2). In the environment, this plutonyl core readily complexes with carbonate as well as other oxygen moieties (OH−, NO2−, NO3−, and SO42−) to form charged complexes which can be readily mobile with low affinities to soil.

PuO2CO32−
PuO2(CO3)24−
PuO2(CO3)36−

PuO2 formed from neutralizing highly acidic nitric acid solutions tends to form polymeric PuO2 which is resistant to complexation. Plutonium also readily shifts valences between the +3, +4, +5 and +6 states. It is common for some fraction of plutonium in solution to exist in all of these states in equilibrium.

Plutonium is known to bind to soil particles very strongly; see above for an X-ray spectroscopic study of plutonium in soil and concrete. While caesium has very different chemistry to the actinides, it is well known that both caesium and many actinides bind strongly to the minerals in soil. it has been possible to use 134Cs-labeled soil to study the migration of Pu and Cs is soils. It has been shown that colloidal transport processes control the migration of Cs (and will control the migration of Pu) in the soil at the Waste Isolation Pilot Plant.

Americium 
Americium often enters landfills from discarded smoke detectors. The rules associated with the disposal of smoke detectors are very relaxed in most municipalities. For instance, in the UK it is permissible to dispose of an americium containing smoke detector by placing it in the dustbin with normal household rubbish, but each dustbin worth of rubbish is limited to only containing one smoke detector. The manufacture of products containing americium (such as smoke detectors) as well as nuclear reactors and explosions may also release the americium into the environment.

In 1999, a truck transporting 900 smoke detectors in France had been reported to have caught fire; it is claimed that this led to a release of americium into the environment. In the U.S., the "Radioactive Boy Scout" David Hahn was able to buy thousands of smoke detectors at remainder prices and concentrate the americium from them.

There have been cases of humans being exposed to americium.  The worst case was that of Harold McCluskey, who was exposed to an extremely high dose of americium-241 after an accident involving a glove box. He was subsequently treated with chelation therapy. It is likely that the medical care which he was given saved his life; despite similar biodistribution and toxicity to plutonium, the two radioactive elements have different solution-state chemistries. Americium is stable in the +3 oxidation state, while the +4 oxidation state of plutonium can form in the human body.

The most common isotope americium-241 decays (half-life 432 years) to neptunium-237 which has a much longer half-life, so in the long term, the issues discussed above for neptunium apply.

Americium released into the environment tends to remain in soil and water at relatively shallow depths and may be taken up by animals and plants during growth; shellfish such as shrimp take up americium-241 in their shells, and parts of grain plants can become contaminated with exposure. In a 2021 paper, J.D. Chaplin et al. reported advances in the Diffusive gradients in thin films technique, which have provided a method to measure labile bioavailable Americium in soils, as well as in freshwater and seawater.

Curium
Atmospheric curium compounds are poorly soluble in common solvents and mostly adhere to soil particles. Soil analysis revealed about 4,000 times higher concentration of curium at the sandy soil particles than in water present in the soil pores. An even higher ratio of about 18,000 was measured in loam soils.

Californium
Californium is fairly insoluble in water, but it adheres well to ordinary soil, and concentrations of it in the soil can be 500 times higher than in the water surrounding the soil particles.

See also 
 Uranium in the environment 
 Radium in the environment
 Background radiation
 Radioecology

References

Further reading
 Hala, Jiri, and James D. Navratil. Radioactivity, Ionizing Radiation and Nuclear Energy. Konvoj: Brno, Czech Republic, 2003. .

External links
 "Why do mechanisms matter in radioactive waste management?" – Royal Society for Chemistry
 "Spectroscopies for Environmental Studies of Actinide Species" – Federation of American Scientists

 
Nuclear materials
Nuclear technology
Nuclear chemistry
Nuclear physics
Inorganic chemistry
Radiobiology
Radioactive contamination
Soil contamination